Safdar Jung is a 1930 action costume silent film directed by A. R. Kardar. The film was the third to be produced by Kardar's United Players Pictures (Playart Phototone), following Husn Ka Daku (1929) and Sarfarosh (1930).

Kardar introduced the actress Mumtaz Begum as the lead heroine in the film. The cast included Gulzar, Mumtaz, Hiralal. The director of photography was K. V. Machve.

For actor Gul Hamid, Safdar Jung was the first of seven silent films he worked in. A police officer in the British Police by profession, he was chosen by Kardar as a leading man due to Hamid's "over-all persona".

Like the rest of the films produced earlier, Safdar Jung was also released at The Deepak cinema in Bhati Gate area of Lahore.

Cast
 Gul Hamid
 Mumtaz Begum
 Gulzar
 Hiralal

References

External links

1930 films
Silent films
Indian silent films
Indian black-and-white films
Films directed by A. R. Kardar
Indian action films
1930s action films